In mathematics, 0.999... (also written as 0., in repeating decimal notation) denotes the repeating decimal consisting of an unending sequence of 9s after the decimal point. This repeating decimal represents the smallest number no less than every decimal number in the sequence (0.9, 0.99, 0.999, ...); that is, the supremum of this sequence. This number is equal to1. In other words, "0.999..." is not "almost exactly" or "very, very nearly but not quite" rather, "0.999..." and "1" represent exactly the same number.

There are many ways of showing this equality, from intuitive arguments to mathematically rigorous proofs.  The technique used depends on the target audience, background assumptions, historical context, and preferred development of the real numbers, the system within which 0.999... is commonly defined. In other systems, 0.999... can have the same meaning, a different definition, or be undefined.

More generally, every nonzero terminating decimal has two equal representations (for example, 8.32 and 8.31999...), which is a property of all positional numeral system representations regardless of base. The utilitarian preference for the terminating decimal representation contributes to the misconception that it is the only representation.  For this and other reasons—such as rigorous proofs relying on non-elementary techniques, properties, or disciplines—some people can find the equality sufficiently counterintuitive that they question or reject it.  This has been the subject of several studies in mathematics education.

Elementary proof

There is an elementary proof of the equation , which uses just the mathematical tools of comparison and addition of (finite) decimal numbers, without any reference to more advanced topics such as series, limits, formal construction of real numbers, etc. The meaning of the notation 0.999... is the least point on the number line lying to the right of all of the numbers 0.9, 0.99, 0.999, etc. Because there is ultimately no room between 1 and these numbers, the point 1 must be this least point, and so .

Intuitive explanation
If one places 0.9, 0.99, 0.999, etc. on the number line, one sees immediately that all these points are to the left of 1, and that they get closer and closer to 1.

Therefore, if 1 were not the smallest number greater than 0.9, 0.99, 0.999, etc., then there would be a point on the number line that lies between 1 and all these points. This is (one version of) the Archimedean property, which can be proven to hold in the system of rational numbers. Therefore, 1 is the smallest number that is greater than all 0.9, 0.99, 0.999, etc., and so .

Discussion on completeness

Part of what this argument shows is that there is a least upper bound of the sequence 0.9, 0.99, 0.999, etc.: a smallest number that is greater than all of the terms of the sequence.  One of the axioms of the real number system is the completeness axiom, which states that every bounded sequence has a least upper bound.  This least upper bound is one way to define infinite decimal expansions: the real number represented by an infinite decimal is the least upper bound of its finite truncations.  The argument here does not need to assume completeness to be valid, because it shows that this particular sequence of rational numbers in fact has a least upper bound, and that this least upper bound is equal to one.

Rigorous proof

The previous explanation is not a proof, as one cannot define properly the relationship between a number and its representation as a point on the number line. For the accuracy of the proof, the number , with  nines after the decimal point, is denoted . As , with  digits after the decimal point, the addition rule for decimal numbers implies

and

for every positive integer .

One has to show that 1 is the smallest number that is no less than all . For this, it suffices to prove that, if a number  is not larger than 1 and no less than all , then . So let  such that

for every positive integer .
Therefore,

which, using basic arithmetic and the first equality established above, simplifies to

Thus this difference must be zero, and, thus ; that is

This proof relies on the fact that zero is the only nonnegative number that is less than all inverses of integers, or equivalently that there is no number that is larger than every integer. This is the Archimedean property, that is verified for rational numbers and real numbers. Real numbers may be enlarged into number systems, such as hyperreal numbers, with infinitely small numbers (infinitesimals) and infinitely large numbers (infinite numbers). When using such systems, notation 0.999... is generally not used, as there is no smallest number that is no less than all . (This  is implied by the fact that  implies ).

Algebraic arguments
Many algebraic arguments have been provided, which suggest that  They are not mathematical proofs since they are typically based on the fact that the rules for adding and multiplying finite decimals extend to infinite decimals. This is true, but the proof is essentially the same as the proof of  So, all these arguments are essentially circular reasoning.

Nevertheless, the matter of overly simplified illustrations of the equality is a subject of pedagogical discussion and critique.   discusses the argument that, in elementary school, one is taught that , so, ignoring all essential subtleties, "multiplying" this identity by  gives .  He further says that this argument is unconvincing, because of an unresolved ambiguity over the meaning of the equals sign; a student might think, "It surely does not mean that the number 1 is identical to that which is meant by the notation ." Most undergraduate mathematics majors encountered by Byers feel that while  is "very close" to 1 on the strength of this argument, with some even saying that it is "infinitely close", they are not ready to say that it is equal to 1.  discusses how "this argument gets its force from the fact that most people have been indoctrinated to accept the first equation without thinking", but also suggests that the argument may lead skeptics to question this assumption.

Byers also presents the following argument.

Students who did not accept the first argument sometimes accept the second argument, but, in Byers' opinion, still have not resolved the ambiguity, and therefore do not understand the representation for infinite decimals.  , presenting the same argument, also state that it does not explain the equality, indicating that such an explanation would likely involve concepts of infinity and completeness.  , citing , also conclude that the treatment of the identity based on such arguments as these, without the formal concept of a limit, is premature.

Analytic proofs
Since the question of 0.999... does not affect the formal development of mathematics, it can be postponed until one proves the standard theorems of real analysis. One requirement is to characterize real numbers that can be written in decimal notation, consisting of an optional sign, a finite sequence of one or more digits forming an integer part, a decimal separator, and a sequence of digits forming a fractional part. For the purpose of discussing 0.999..., the integer part can be summarized as b0 and one can neglect negatives, so a decimal expansion has the form

The fraction part, unlike the integer part, is not limited to finitely many digits. This is a positional notation, so for example the digit 5 in 500 contributes ten times as much as the 5 in 50, and the 5 in 0.05 contributes one tenth as much as the 5 in 0.5.

Infinite series and sequences

A common development of decimal expansions is to define them as sums of infinite series. In general:

For 0.999... one can apply the convergence theorem concerning geometric series:

Since 0.999... is such a sum with a = 9 and common ratio r = , the theorem makes short work of the question:

This proof appears as early as 1770 in Leonhard Euler's Elements of Algebra.

The sum of a geometric series is itself a result even older than Euler. A typical 18th-century derivation used a term-by-term manipulation similar to the algebraic proof given above, and as late as 1811, Bonnycastle's textbook An Introduction to Algebra uses such an argument for geometric series to justify the same maneuver on 0.999... A 19th-century reaction against such liberal summation methods resulted in the definition that still dominates today: the sum of a series is defined to be the limit of the sequence of its partial sums. A corresponding proof of the theorem explicitly computes that sequence; it can be found in any proof-based introduction to calculus or analysis.

A sequence (x0, x1, x2, ...) has a limit x if the distance |x − xn| becomes arbitrarily small as n increases. The statement that 0.999... = 1 can itself be interpreted and proven as a limit:

The first two equalities can be interpreted as symbol shorthand definitions. The remaining equalities can be proven. The last step, that  → 0 as n → ∞, is often justified by the Archimedean property of the real numbers. This limit-based attitude towards 0.999... is often put in more evocative but less precise terms. For example, the 1846 textbook The University Arithmetic explains, ".999 +, continued to infinity = 1, because every annexation of a 9 brings the value closer to 1"; the 1895 Arithmetic for Schools says, "when a large number of 9s is taken, the difference between 1 and .99999... becomes inconceivably small". Such heuristics are often incorrectly interpreted by students as implying that 0.999... itself is less than 1.

Nested intervals and least upper bounds

The series definition above is a simple way to define the real number named by a decimal expansion. A complementary approach is tailored to the opposite process: for a given real number, define the decimal expansion(s) to name it.

If a real number x is known to lie in the closed interval [0, 10] (i.e., it is greater than or equal to 0 and less than or equal to 10), one can imagine dividing that interval into ten pieces that overlap only at their endpoints: [0, 1], [1, 2], [2, 3], and so on up to [9, 10]. The number x must belong to one of these; if it belongs to [2, 3] then one records the digit "2" and subdivides that interval into [2, 2.1], [2.1, 2.2], ..., [2.8, 2.9], [2.9, 3]. Continuing this process yields an infinite sequence of nested intervals, labeled by an infinite sequence of digits b0, b1, b2, b3, ..., and one writes

In this formalism, the identities 1 = 0.999... and 1 = 1.000... reflect, respectively, the fact that 1 lies in both [0, 1] and [1, 2], so one can choose either subinterval when finding its digits. To ensure that this notation does not abuse the "=" sign, one needs a way to reconstruct a unique real number for each decimal. This can be done with limits, but other constructions continue with the ordering theme.

One straightforward choice is the nested intervals theorem, which guarantees that given a sequence of nested, closed intervals whose lengths become arbitrarily small, the intervals contain exactly one real number in their intersection. So b0.b1b2b3... is defined to be the unique number contained within all the intervals [b0, b0 + 1], [b0.b1, b0.b1 + 0.1], and so on. 0.999... is then the unique real number that lies in all of the intervals [0, 1], [0.9, 1], [0.99, 1], and [0.99...9, 1] for every finite string of 9s. Since 1 is an element of each of these intervals, 0.999... = 1.

The Nested Intervals Theorem is usually founded upon a more fundamental characteristic of the real numbers: the existence of least upper bounds or suprema. To directly exploit these objects, one may define b0.b1b2b3... to be the least upper bound of the set of approximants {b0, b0.b1, b0.b1b2, ...}. One can then show that this definition (or the nested intervals definition) is consistent with the subdivision procedure, implying 0.999... = 1 again. Tom Apostol concludes,

Proofs from the construction of the real numbers

Some approaches explicitly define real numbers to be certain structures built upon the rational numbers, using axiomatic set theory. The natural numbers – 0, 1, 2, 3, and so on – begin with 0 and continue upwards, so that every number has a successor. One can extend the natural numbers with their negatives to give all the integers, and to further extend to ratios, giving the rational numbers. These number systems are accompanied by the arithmetic of addition, subtraction, multiplication, and division. More subtly, they include ordering, so that one number can be compared to another and found to be less than, greater than, or equal to another number.

The step from rationals to reals is a major extension. There are at least two popular ways to achieve this step, both published in 1872: Dedekind cuts and Cauchy sequences. Proofs that 0.999... = 1 which directly use these constructions are not found in textbooks on real analysis, where the modern trend for the last few decades has been to use an axiomatic analysis. Even when a construction is offered, it is usually applied towards proving the axioms of the real numbers, which then support the above proofs. However, several authors express the idea that starting with a construction is more logically appropriate, and the resulting proofs are more self-contained.

Dedekind cuts

In the Dedekind cut approach, each real number x is defined as the infinite set of all rational numbers less than x. In particular, the real number 1 is the set of all rational numbers that are less than 1. Every positive decimal expansion easily determines a Dedekind cut: the set of rational numbers which are less than some stage of the expansion. So the real number 0.999... is the set of rational numbers r such that r < 0, or r < 0.9, or r < 0.99, or r is less than some other number of the form

Every element of 0.999... is less than 1, so it is an element of the real number 1. Conversely, all elements of 1 are rational numbers that can be written as

This implies

and thus

and since

by the definition above, every element of 1 is also an element of 0.999..., and, combined with the proof above that every element of 0.999... is also an element of 1, the sets 0.999... and 1 contain the same rational numbers, and are therefore the same set, that is, 0.999... = 1.

The definition of real numbers as Dedekind cuts was first published by Richard Dedekind in 1872.
The above approach to assigning a real number to each decimal expansion is due to an expository paper titled "Is 0.999 ... = 1?" by Fred Richman in Mathematics Magazine, which is targeted at teachers of collegiate mathematics, especially at the junior/senior level, and their students. Richman notes that taking Dedekind cuts in any dense subset of the rational numbers yields the same results; in particular, he uses decimal fractions, for which the proof is more immediate. He also notes that typically the definitions allow
{ x : x < 1 } to be a cut but not { x : x ≤ 1 } (or vice versa) "Why do that? Precisely to rule out the existence of distinct numbers 0.9* and 1. [...] So we see that in the traditional definition of the real numbers, the equation 0.9* = 1 is built in at the beginning." A further modification of the procedure leads to a different structure where the two are not equal. Although it is consistent, many of the common rules of decimal arithmetic no longer hold, for example the fraction  has no representation; see "Alternative number systems" below.

Cauchy sequences

Another approach is to define a real number as the limit of a Cauchy sequence of rational numbers. This construction of the real numbers uses the ordering of rationals less directly. First, the distance between x and y is defined as the absolute value |x − y|, where the absolute value |z| is defined as the maximum of z and −z, thus never negative. Then the reals are defined to be the sequences of rationals that have the Cauchy sequence property using this distance. That is, in the sequence (x0, x1, x2, ...), a mapping from natural numbers to rationals, for any positive rational δ there is an N such that |xm − xn| ≤ δ for all m, n > N. (The distance between terms becomes smaller than any positive rational.)

If (xn) and (yn) are two Cauchy sequences, then they are defined to be equal as real numbers if the sequence (xn − yn) has the limit 0. Truncations of the decimal number b0.b1b2b3... generate a sequence of rationals which is Cauchy; this is taken to define the real value of the number. Thus in this formalism the task is to show that the sequence of rational numbers

has the limit 0.

This limit is plain if one understands the definition of limit. So again 0.999... = 1.

The definition of real numbers as Cauchy sequences was first published separately by Eduard Heine and Georg Cantor, also in 1872. The above approach to decimal expansions, including the proof that 0.999... = 1, closely follows Griffiths & Hilton's 1970 work A comprehensive textbook of classical mathematics: A contemporary interpretation. The book is written specifically to offer a second look at familiar concepts in a contemporary light.

Infinite decimal representation 

Commonly in secondary schools' mathematics education, the real numbers are constructed by defining a number using an integer followed by a radix point and an infinite sequence written out as a string to represent the fractional part of any given real number. In this construction, the set of any combination of an integer and digits after the decimal point (or radix point in non-base 10 systems) is the set of real numbers. This construction can be rigorously shown to satisfy all of the real axioms after defining an equivalence relation over the set that defines 1 =eq 0.999... as well as for any other nonzero decimals with only finitely many nonzero terms in the decimal string with its trailing 9s version. With this construction of the reals, all proofs of the statement "1 = 0.999..." can be viewed as implicitly assuming the equality when any operations are performed on the real numbers.

Dense order 

One of the notions that can resolve the issue is the requirement that real numbers are densely ordered. Students are taking for granted that  is before  while this kind of intuitive ordering is better defined as purely lexicographical.

"... the ordering of the real numbers is recognized as a dense order. However, depending on the context, students can reconcile this property with the existence of numbers just before or after a given number (0.999... is thus often seen as the predecessor of 1)."

Dense ordering implies that if there is no new element strictly between two elements of the set, the two elements must be considered equal.

Generalizations
The result that 0.999... = 1 generalizes readily in two ways. First, every nonzero number with a finite decimal notation (equivalently, endless trailing 0s) has a counterpart with trailing 9s. For example, 0.24999... equals 0.25, exactly as in the special case considered. These numbers are exactly the decimal fractions, and they are dense.

Second, a comparable theorem applies in each radix or base. For example, in base 2 (the binary numeral system) 0.111... equals 1, and in base 3 (the ternary numeral system) 0.222... equals 1. In general, any terminating base b expression has a counterpart with repeated trailing digits equal to b − 1. Textbooks of real analysis are likely to skip the example of 0.999... and present one or both of these generalizations from the start.

Alternative representations of 1 also occur in non-integer bases. For example, in the golden ratio base, the two standard representations are 1.000... and 0.101010..., and there are infinitely many more representations that include adjacent 1s. Generally, for almost all q between 1 and 2, there are uncountably many base-q expansions of 1. On the other hand, there are still uncountably many q (including all natural numbers greater than 1) for which there is only one base-q expansion of 1, other than the trivial 1.000.... This result was first obtained by Paul Erdős, Miklos Horváth, and István Joó around 1990. In 1998 Vilmos Komornik and Paola Loreti determined the smallest such base, the Komornik–Loreti constant q = 1.787231650.... In this base, 1 = 0.11010011001011010010110011010011...; the digits are given by the Thue–Morse sequence, which does not repeat.

A more far-reaching generalization addresses the most general positional numeral systems. They too have multiple representations, and in some sense the difficulties are even worse. For example:
 In the balanced ternary system,  = 0.111... = 1.111....
 In the reverse factorial number system (using bases 2!,3!,4!,... for positions after the decimal point), 1 = 1.000... = 0.1234....

Impossibility of unique representation
That all these different number systems suffer from multiple representations for some real numbers can be attributed to a fundamental difference between the real numbers as an ordered set and collections of infinite strings of symbols, ordered lexicographically. Indeed, the following two properties account for the difficulty:
 If an interval of the real numbers is partitioned into two non-empty parts L, R, such that every element of L is (strictly) less than every element of R, then either L contains a largest element or R contains a smallest element, but not both.
 The collection of infinite strings of symbols taken from any finite "alphabet", lexicographically ordered, can be partitioned into two non-empty parts L, R, such that every element of L is less than every element of R, while L contains a largest element and R contains a smallest element. Indeed, it suffices to take two finite prefixes (initial substrings) p1, p2 of elements from the collection such that they differ only in their final symbol, for which symbol they have successive values, and take for L the set of all strings in the collection whose corresponding prefix is at most p1, and for R the remainder, the strings in the collection whose corresponding prefix is at least p2. Then L has a largest element, starting with p1 and choosing the largest available symbol in all following positions, while R has a smallest element obtained by following p2 by the smallest symbol in all positions.

The first point follows from basic properties of the real numbers: L has a supremum and R has an infimum, which are easily seen to be equal; being a real number it either lies in R or in L, but not both since L and R are supposed to be disjoint. The second point generalizes the 0.999.../1.000... pair obtained for p1 = "0", p2 = "1". In fact one need not use the same alphabet for all positions (so that for instance mixed radix systems can be included) or consider the full collection of possible strings; the only important points are that at each position a finite set of symbols (which may even depend on the previous symbols) can be chosen from (this is needed to ensure maximal and minimal choices), and that making a valid choice for any position should result in a valid infinite string (so one should not allow "9" in each position while forbidding an infinite succession of "9"s). Under these assumptions, the above argument shows that an order preserving map from the collection of strings to an interval of the real numbers cannot be a bijection: either some numbers do not correspond to any string, or some of them correspond to more than one string.

Marko Petkovšek has proven that for any positional system that names all the real numbers, the set of reals with multiple representations is always dense. He calls the proof "an instructive exercise in elementary point-set topology"; it involves viewing sets of positional values as Stone spaces and noticing that their real representations are given by continuous functions.

Applications
One application of 0.999... as a representation of 1 occurs in elementary number theory. In 1802, H. Goodwin published an observation on the appearance of 9s in the repeating-decimal representations of fractions whose denominators are certain prime numbers. Examples include:
  = 0. and 142 + 857 = 999.
  = 0. and 0136 + 9863 = 9999.
E. Midy proved a general result about such fractions, now called Midy's theorem, in 1836. The publication was obscure, and it is unclear if his proof directly involved 0.999..., but at least one modern proof by W. G. Leavitt does. If it can be proved that if a decimal of the form 0.b1b2b3... is a positive integer, then it must be 0.999..., which is then the source of the 9s in the theorem. Investigations in this direction can motivate such concepts as greatest common divisors, modular arithmetic, Fermat primes, order of group elements, and quadratic reciprocity.

Returning to real analysis, the base-3 analogue 0.222... = 1 plays a key role in a characterization of one of the simplest fractals, the middle-thirds Cantor set:
 A point in the unit interval lies in the Cantor set if and only if it can be represented in ternary using only the digits 0 and 2.

The nth digit of the representation reflects the position of the point in the nth stage of the construction. For example, the point  is given the usual representation of 0.2 or 0.2000..., since it lies to the right of the first deletion and to the left of every deletion thereafter. The point  is represented not as 0.1 but as 0.0222..., since it lies to the left of the first deletion and to the right of every deletion thereafter.

Repeating nines also turn up in yet another of Georg Cantor's works. They must be taken into account to construct a valid proof, applying his 1891 diagonal argument to decimal expansions, of the uncountability of the unit interval. Such a proof needs to be able to declare certain pairs of real numbers to be different based on their decimal expansions, so one needs to avoid pairs like 0.2 and 0.1999... A simple method represents all numbers with nonterminating expansions; the opposite method rules out repeating nines. A variant that may be closer to Cantor's original argument actually uses base 2, and by turning base-3 expansions into base-2 expansions, one can prove the uncountability of the Cantor set as well.

Skepticism in education
Students of mathematics often reject the equality of 0.999... and 1, for reasons ranging from their disparate appearance to deep misgivings over the limit concept and disagreements over the nature of infinitesimals. There are many common contributing factors to the confusion:
 Students are often "mentally committed to the notion that a number can be represented in one and only one way by a decimal." Seeing two manifestly different decimals representing the same number appears to be a paradox, which is amplified by the appearance of the seemingly well-understood number 1.
 Some students interpret "0.999..." (or similar notation) as a large but finite string of 9s, possibly with a variable, unspecified length. If they accept an infinite string of nines, they may still expect a last 9 "at infinity".
 Intuition and ambiguous teaching lead students to think of the limit of a sequence as a kind of infinite process rather than a fixed value, since a sequence need not reach its limit. Where students accept the difference between a sequence of numbers and its limit, they might read "0.999..." as meaning the sequence rather than its limit.

These ideas are mistaken in the context of the standard real numbers, although some may be valid in other number systems, either invented for their general mathematical utility or as instructive counterexamples to better understand 0.999...

Many of these explanations were found by David Tall, who has studied characteristics of teaching and cognition that lead to some of the misunderstandings he has encountered in his college students. Interviewing his students to determine why the vast majority initially rejected the equality, he found that "students continued to conceive of 0.999... as a sequence of numbers getting closer and closer to 1 and not a fixed value, because 'you haven't specified how many places there are' or 'it is the nearest possible decimal below 1.

The elementary argument of multiplying 0.333... =  by 3 can convince reluctant students that 0.999... = 1. Still, when confronted with the conflict between their belief of the first equation and their disbelief of the second, some students either begin to disbelieve the first equation or simply become frustrated. Nor are more sophisticated methods foolproof: students who are fully capable of applying rigorous definitions may still fall back on intuitive images when they are surprised by a result in advanced mathematics, including 0.999.... For example, one real analysis student was able to prove that 0.333... =  using a supremum definition, but then insisted that 0.999... < 1 based on her earlier understanding of long division. Others still are able to prove that  = 0.333..., but, upon being confronted by the fractional proof, insist that "logic" supersedes the mathematical calculations.

Joseph Mazur tells the tale of an otherwise brilliant calculus student of his who "challenged almost everything I said in class but never questioned his calculator," and who had come to believe that nine digits are all one needs to do mathematics, including calculating the square root of 23. The student remained uncomfortable with a limiting argument that 9.99... = 10, calling it a "wildly imagined infinite growing process."

As part of Ed Dubinsky's APOS theory of mathematical learning, he and his collaborators (2005) propose that students who conceive of 0.999... as a finite, indeterminate string with an infinitely small distance from 1 have "not yet constructed a complete process conception of the infinite decimal". Other students who have a complete process conception of 0.999... may not yet be able to "encapsulate" that process into an "object conception", like the object conception they have of 1, and so they view the process 0.999... and the object 1 as incompatible. Dubinsky et al. also link this mental ability of encapsulation to viewing  as a number in its own right and to dealing with the set of natural numbers as a whole.

Cultural phenomenon
With the rise of the Internet, debates about 0.999... have become commonplace on newsgroups and message boards, including many that nominally have little to do with mathematics. In the newsgroup , arguing over 0.999... is described as a "popular sport", and it is one of the questions answered in its FAQ.

A 2003 edition of the general-interest newspaper column The Straight Dope discusses 0.999... via  and limits, saying of misconceptions,

A Slate article reports that the concept of 0.999... is "hotly disputed on websites ranging from World of Warcraft message boards to Ayn Rand forums". In the same vein, the question of 0.999... proved such a popular topic in the first seven years of Blizzard Entertainment's Battle.net forums that the company issued a "press release" on April Fools' Day 2004 that it is 1:

Two proofs are then offered, based on limits and multiplication by 10.

0.999... features also in mathematical jokes, such as:

In alternative number systems
Although the real numbers form an extremely useful number system, the decision to interpret the notation "0.999..." as naming a real number is ultimately a convention, and Timothy Gowers argues in Mathematics: A Very Short Introduction that the resulting identity 0.999... = 1 is a convention as well:

Infinitesimals

Some proofs that 0.999... = 1 rely on the Archimedean property of the real numbers: that there are no nonzero infinitesimals. Specifically, the difference 1 − 0.999... must be smaller than any positive rational number, so it must be an infinitesimal; but since the reals do not contain nonzero infinitesimals, the difference is therefore zero, and therefore the two values are the same.

However, there are mathematically coherent ordered algebraic structures, including various alternatives to the real numbers, which are non-Archimedean. Non-standard analysis provides a number system with a full array of infinitesimals (and their inverses). A. H. Lightstone developed a decimal expansion for hyperreal numbers in (0, 1)∗. Lightstone shows how to associate to each number a sequence of digits,

indexed by the hypernatural numbers. While he does not directly discuss 0.999..., he shows the real number  is represented by 0.333...;...333... which is a consequence of the transfer principle. As a consequence the number 0.999...;...999... = 1. With this type of decimal representation, not every expansion represents a number. In particular "0.333...;...000..." and "0.999...;...000..." do not correspond to any number.

The standard definition of the number 0.999... is the limit of the sequence 0.9, 0.99, 0.999, ...  A different definition involves what Terry Tao refers to as ultralimit, i.e., the equivalence class [(0.9, 0.99, 0.999, ...)] of this sequence in the ultrapower construction, which is a number that falls short of 1 by an infinitesimal amount. More generally, the hyperreal number  with last digit 9 at infinite hypernatural rank H, satisfies a strict inequality  Accordingly, an alternative interpretation for "zero followed by infinitely many 9s" could be

All such interpretations of "0.999..." are infinitely close to 1. Ian Stewart characterizes this interpretation as an "entirely reasonable" way to rigorously justify the intuition that "there's a little bit missing" from 1 in 0.999....

Hackenbush
Combinatorial game theory provides alternative reals as well, with infinite Blue-Red Hackenbush as one particularly relevant example. In 1974, Elwyn Berlekamp described a correspondence between Hackenbush strings and binary expansions of real numbers, motivated by the idea of data compression. For example, the value of the Hackenbush string LRRLRLRL... is 0.0101012... = . However, the value of LRLLL... (corresponding to 0.111...2) is infinitesimally less than 1. The difference between the two is the surreal number , where ω is the first infinite ordinal; the relevant game is LRRRR... or 0.000...2.

This is in fact true of the binary expansions of many rational numbers, where the values of the numbers are equal but the corresponding binary tree paths are different. For example, 0.10111...2 = 0.11000...2, which are both equal to 3/4, but the first representation corresponds to the binary tree path LRLRLLL... while the second corresponds to the different path LRLLRRR....

Revisiting subtraction
Another manner in which the proofs might be undermined is if 1 − 0.999... simply does not exist, because subtraction is not always possible. Mathematical structures with an addition operation but not a subtraction operation include commutative semigroups, commutative monoids and semirings. Richman considers two such systems, designed so that 0.999... < 1.

First, Richman defines a nonnegative decimal number to be a literal decimal expansion. He defines the lexicographical order and an addition operation, noting that 0.999... < 1 simply because 0 < 1 in the ones place, but for any nonterminating x, one has 0.999... + x = 1 + x. After defining multiplication, the decimal numbers form a positive, totally ordered, commutative semiring.

In the process of defining multiplication, Richman also defines another system he calls "cut D", which is the set of Dedekind cuts of decimal fractions. Ordinarily this definition leads to the real numbers, but for a decimal fraction d he allows both the cut (−∞, d) and the "principal cut" (−∞, d]. The result is that the real numbers are "living uneasily together with" the decimal fractions. Again 0.999... < 1. There are no positive infinitesimals in cut D, but there is "a sort of negative infinitesimal," 0−, which has no decimal expansion. He concludes that 0.999... = 1 + 0−, while the equation "0.999... + x = 1" has no solution.

p-adic numbers

When asked about 0.999..., novices often believe there should be a "final 9", believing 1 − 0.999... to be a positive number which they write as "0.000...1". Whether or not that makes sense, the intuitive goal is clear: adding a 1 to the final 9 in 0.999... would carry all the 9s into 0s and leave a 1 in the ones place. Among other reasons, this idea fails because there is no "final 9" in 0.999.... However, there is a system that contains an infinite string of 9s including a last 9.

The p-adic numbers are an alternative number system of interest in number theory. Like the real numbers, the p-adic numbers can be built from the rational numbers via Cauchy sequences; the construction uses a different metric in which 0 is closer to p, and much closer to pn, than it is to 1. The p-adic numbers form a field for prime p and a ring for other p, including 10. So arithmetic can be performed in the p-adics, and there are no infinitesimals.

In the 10-adic numbers, the analogues of decimal expansions run to the left. The 10-adic expansion ...999 does have a last 9, and it does not have a first 9. One can add 1 to the ones place, and it leaves behind only 0s after carrying through: 1 + ...999 = ...000 = 0, and so ...999 = −1. Another derivation uses a geometric series. The infinite series implied by "...999" does not converge in the real numbers, but it converges in the 10-adics, and so one can re-use the familiar formula:

(Compare with the series above.) A third derivation was invented by a seventh-grader who was doubtful over her teacher's limiting argument that 0.999... = 1 but was inspired to take the multiply-by-10 proof above in the opposite direction: if x = ...999 then 10x =  ...990, so 10x = x − 9, hence x = −1 again.

As a final extension, since 0.999... = 1 (in the reals) and ...999 = −1 (in the 10-adics), then by "blind faith and unabashed juggling of symbols" one may add the two equations and arrive at ...999.999... = 0. This equation does not make sense either as a 10-adic expansion or an ordinary decimal expansion, but it turns out to be meaningful and true in the doubly infinite decimal expansion of the 10-adic solenoid, with eventually repeating left ends to represent the real numbers and eventually repeating right ends to represent the 10-adic numbers.

Ultrafinitism
The philosophy of ultrafinitism rejects as meaningless concepts dealing with infinite sets, such as idea that the notation  might stand for a decimal number with an infinite sequence of nines, as well as the summation of infinitely many numbers  corresponding to the positional values of the decimal digits in that infinite string. In this approach to mathematics, only some particular (fixed) number of finite decimal digits is meaningful.  Instead of "equality", one has "approximate equality", which is equality up to the number of decimal digits that one is permitted to compute.  Although Katz and Katz argue that ultrafinitism may capture the student intuition that 0.999... ought to be less than 1, the ideas of ultrafinitism do not enjoy widespread acceptance in the mathematical community, and the philosophy lacks a generally agreed-upon formal mathematical foundation.

Related questions

 Zeno's paradoxes, particularly the paradox of the runner, are reminiscent of the apparent paradox that 0.999... and 1 are equal. The runner paradox can be mathematically modelled and then, like 0.999..., resolved using a geometric series. However, it is not clear if this mathematical treatment addresses the underlying metaphysical issues Zeno was exploring.
 Division by zero occurs in some popular discussions of 0.999..., and it also stirs up contention. While most authors choose to define 0.999..., almost all modern treatments leave division by zero undefined, as it can be given no meaning in the standard real numbers. However, division by zero is defined in some other systems, such as complex analysis, where the extended complex plane, i.e. the Riemann sphere, has a "point at infinity". Here, it makes sense to define  to be infinity; and, in fact, the results are profound and applicable to many problems in engineering and physics. Some prominent mathematicians argued for such a definition long before either number system was developed.
 Negative zero is another redundant feature of many ways of writing numbers. In number systems, such as the real numbers, where "0" denotes the additive identity and is neither positive nor negative, the usual interpretation of "−0" is that it should denote the additive inverse of 0, which forces −0 = 0. Nonetheless, some scientific applications use separate positive and negative zeroes, as do some computing binary number systems (for example integers stored in the sign and magnitude or ones' complement formats, or floating point numbers as specified by the IEEE floating-point standard).

See also
 Finitism
 Informal mathematics
 Limit (mathematics)
 Series (mathematics)

Notes

References

 
 This introductory textbook on dynamical systems is aimed at undergraduate and beginning graduate students. (p. ix)
 
 A transition from calculus to advanced analysis, Mathematical analysis is intended to be "honest, rigorous, up to date, and, at the same time, not too pedantic." (pref.) Apostol's development of the real numbers uses the least upper bound axiom and introduces infinite decimals two pages later. (pp. 9–11)
 
 
 This text aims to be "an accessible, reasonably paced textbook that deals with the fundamental concepts and techniques of real analysis." Its development of the real numbers relies on the supremum axiom. (pp. vii–viii)
 
 
 
 
 
 This book presents an analysis of paradoxes and fallacies as a tool for exploring its central topic, "the rather tenuous relationship between mathematical reality and physical reality". It assumes first-year high-school algebra; further mathematics is developed in the book, including geometric series in Chapter 2. Although 0.999... is not one of the paradoxes to be fully treated, it is briefly mentioned during a development of Cantor's diagonal method. (pp. ix-xi, 119)
 
 
 
 This text assumes "a stiff course in basic calculus" as a prerequisite; its stated principles are to present complex analysis as "An Introduction to Mathematics" and to state the material clearly and precisely. (p. vii)
 
 
 
 
 
 An introductory undergraduate textbook in set theory that "presupposes no specific background". It is written to accommodate a course focusing on axiomatic set theory or on the construction of number systems; the axiomatic material is marked such that it may be de-emphasized. (pp. xi–xii)
 
 
 
 
 
 
 This book grew out of a course for Birmingham-area grammar school mathematics teachers. The course was intended to convey a university-level perspective on school mathematics, and the book is aimed at students "who have reached roughly the level of completing one year of specialist mathematical study at a university". The real numbers are constructed in Chapter 24, "perhaps the most difficult chapter in the entire book", although the authors ascribe much of the difficulty to their use of ideal theory, which is not reproduced here. (pp. vii, xiv)
 
 
 
 
 
 
 
 
 Mankiewicz seeks to represent "the history of mathematics in an accessible style" by combining visual and qualitative aspects of mathematics, mathematicians' writings, and historical sketches. (p. 8)
 
 A topical rather than chronological review of infinity, this book is "intended for the general reader" but "told from the point of view of a mathematician". On the dilemma of rigor versus readable language, Maor comments, "I hope I have succeeded in properly addressing this problem." (pp. x-xiii)
 
 
 Intended as an introduction "at the senior or first-year graduate level" with no formal prerequisites: "I do not even assume the reader knows much set theory." (p. xi) Munkres' treatment of the reals is axiomatic; he claims of bare-hands constructions, "This way of approaching the subject takes a good deal of time and effort and is of greater logical than mathematical interest." (p. 30)
 
 
 
 
 
 
 This book aims to "present a theoretical foundation of analysis that is suitable for students who have completed a standard course in calculus." (p. vii) At the end of Chapter 2, the authors assume as an axiom for the real numbers that bounded, nondecreasing sequences converge, later proving the nested intervals theorem and the least upper bound property. (pp. 56–64) Decimal expansions appear in Appendix 3, "Expansions of real numbers in any base". (pp. 503–507)
 
 While assuming familiarity with the rational numbers, Pugh introduces Dedekind cuts as soon as possible, saying of the axiomatic treatment, "This is something of a fraud, considering that the entire structure of analysis is built on the real number system." (p. 10) After proving the least upper bound property and some allied facts, cuts are not used in the rest of the book.
 
  Free HTML preprint:  Note: the journal article contains material and wording not found in the preprint.
 
  This book gives a "careful rigorous" introduction to real analysis. It gives the axioms of the real numbers and then constructs them (pp. 27–31) as infinite decimals with 0.999... = 1 as part of the definition.
 
 A textbook for an advanced undergraduate course. "Experience has convinced me that it is pedagogically unsound (though logically correct) to start off with the construction of the real numbers from the rational ones. At the beginning, most students simply fail to appreciate the need for doing this. Accordingly, the real number system is introduced as an ordered field with the least-upper-bound property, and a few interesting applications of this property are quickly made. However, Dedekind's construction is not omitted. It is now in an Appendix to Chapter 1, where it may be studied and enjoyed whenever the time is ripe." (p. ix)
 
 
 
 
 
 
 
 This book aims to "assist students in discovering calculus" and "to foster conceptual understanding". (p. v) It omits proofs of the foundations of calculus.

Further reading

 
 
 
 
 
 
 
 
 This article is a field study involving a student who developed a Leibnizian-style theory of infinitesimals to help her understand calculus, and in particular to account for  falling short of 1 by an infinitesimal

External links

 .999999... = 1? from cut-the-knot
 Why does 0.9999... = 1 ?
 Proof of the equality based on arithmetic
 David Tall's research on mathematics cognition
 What is so wrong with thinking of real numbers as infinite decimals?
 Theorem 0.999... on Metamath

1 (number)
Mathematical paradoxes
Real numbers
Articles containing proofs